Several ships have been named Cyrus for Cyrus: 

 , was launched at Salem in 1792 or 1800 (records differ); The British captured her in 1803 and she became a whaler that made 17 whaling voyages between 1804 and 1853. She made one more mercantile voyage in 1854 and then disappears from Lloyd's Register.
 This Cyrus should not be confused with the American whaler, Cyrus, of Nantucket, which sailed during the same era. A bill of sale in the Nantucket Historical Association Research Library shows that a whaling vessel named Cyrus had several owners and was registered in London in 1916. Several sources speak of a Cyrus and an incident at Pitcairn, but some call it a London whaler and others an American whaler.  However, testimony from the crew confirms this ship was sailing elsewhere under a different Captain.
  was launched at Whitby. She spent her early career as a transport. Then after the war she made one or more voyages to Bengal and Ceylon under a license from the British East India Company. After her return she traded between Great Britain and North America. She was wrecked at Quebec in November 1844.
 On 23 December 1858 the brig Cyrus took shelter from a storm off Cape Flattery, Vancouver Island. She anchored in Port San Juan, but her anchor chain broke and she was driven ashore near the mouth of the Gordon river.
  was launched Kingston upon Hull in 1815. She sailed on annual voyages to Greenland as a whaler. She was lost in July 1823. 
 A Cyrus was wrecked at Hartlepool, England. 9 February 1861.

See also
 , any one of three vessels of the British Royal Navy

References

Ship names